The London and North Western Railway (LNWR) Class B was a class of 0-8-0 steam locomotives introduced in 1901.  A development of the three-cylinder compound Class A (though this letter classification was not introduced until 1911), they had a 4-cylinder compound arrangement.  170 were built between 1901-1904.

Rebuilds
Class E
Between 1904 and 1908, Webb's successor George Whale added a leading pony truck to 26 engines, making them 2-8-0s and taking them into Class E (again from 1911).

Class F
Between 1906 and 1908, Whale also rebuilt 10 with larger Experiment-type boiler to Class F, again adding a leading pony truck. (Two more of Class B were also converted to Class F via Class E).

Class G
Neither of the above conversions was particularly successful and, as a result, 32 were rebuilt to Class G with 2-cylinder simple expansion between 1910 and 1917.

Class G1
Whale's Successor Charles Bowen Cooke rebuilt a further 91 direct from Class B to 2-cylinder simple superheated LNWR Class G1 (also known as "Super Ds"). The rebuilds from Class B to Class G1 continued under LMS ownership between 1923 and 1927.

Summary
A total of 170 locomotives was built but No. 134 was destroyed in a boiler explosion at Buxton on 11 November 1921 leaving 169. The rebuilds (some under LMS ownership) totalled 159, leaving 10 unrebuilt.

LMS ownership
The London, Midland and Scottish Railway (LMS) inherited 53 unrebuilt Class B locomotives in 1923 and numbered them 8900-8952. The LMS continued to rebuild them to Class G1 and the number of unrebuilt locomotives dwindled to 10.

Withdrawal
The remaining 10 Class B locomotives were withdrawn in 1927-1928.  None were preserved.

References

Further reading

 Bob Essery & David Jenkinson An Illustrated Review of LMS Locomotives Vol. 2 Absorbed Pre-Group Classes Western and Central Divisions
 Edward Talbot, The London & North Western Railway Eight-Coupled Goods Engines
 Willie Yeadon, Yeadon's Compendium of LNWR Locomotives Vol 2 Goods Tender Engines

B
0-8-0 locomotives
Compound locomotives
Railway locomotives introduced in 1901
Standard gauge steam locomotives of Great Britain
D n4v locomotives